Viscerotropic leishmaniasis is a systemic infection reported in soldiers fighting in Operation Desert Storm in Saudi Arabia.

See also 
 Leishmaniasis
 Skin lesion

References 

Parasitic infestations, stings, and bites of the skin
Leishmaniasis